Kumar and Mr. Jones is a Canadian short drama film, directed by Sugith Varughese and released in 1991. The film centres on the relationship between Mr. Jones (John Gilbert), a bedridden older man, and Kumar (Ivan Smith), his Indo-Canadian caretaker whose power in the relationship is threatened when Mr. Jones begins responding favourably to treatment by Melissa (Michelle Duquet), a new physical therapist.

The film was made while Varughese was a student at the Canadian Film Centre.

The film received a Genie Award nomination for Best Live Action Short Drama at the 13th Genie Awards in 1992.

References

External links

1991 short films
1991 films
Canadian Film Centre films
Films about Indian Canadians
1990s English-language films
Canadian drama short films
1990s Canadian films